The National Streetworks Gazetteer is a service provided in partnership between Ordnance Survey and British highway authorities – the County, City or District Councils – which provides information on each and every adopted highway in England and Wales. Different legislation exists for the system in Scotland. 

The Gazetteer is used to provide noticing to the Highway Authorities by statutory undertakers, the name given to contractors such as Enterprise plc or Balfour Beatty, before any roadworks, or excavation of footpaths or carriageways can be executed. Notifying the Highway Authorities is required by law through the New Roads and Streetworks Act 1991 and the Traffic Management Act 2004. 

Each highway authority in England and Wales must provide up-to-date information to keep the Gazetteer updated twice a year. This ensures that following any excavation by a contractor, the correct concrete or tarmac is used by those carrying out the works. The Gazetteer also provides information relating to the "traffic sensitivity" of the highway, which is a state given to any roads the councils believe are too busy for works to be carried out without prior notice.

Data
The entries on each street supply every publicly owned highway with a unique number, known as the Unique Street Reference Number. An example of an entry in the Gazetteer includes the carriageway type – indicating the kind of tarmac required for reinstatement – and any traffic sensitive restrictions.

References

Streetworks